Festuca porcii is a species of grass which can be found in Central, Eastern, and southeastern parts of Europe.

Description
The plant is perennial and caespitose with  culms. The ligule is going around the eciliate membrane. Leaf-blades are flat and are  broad, while their venation have 13 vascular bundles.

The glumes are chartaceous, lanceolate and keelless. Lemma itself is muticous with acuminate apex. The fruits are caryopses with an additional pericarp that is ellipsoid, while the hilum is linear.

References

porcii
Flora of Europe